Charles August Hunt (August 28, 1896 - December 27, 1978) served in the California State Assembly for the 45th district from 1933 to 1939. During World War I, he was in the United States Army from April 1917 to May 1919 and became a private first class. He served in the Headquarters Battery, 16th Field Artillery Regiment.

He is buried at Riverside National Cemetery, Riverside, California.

References

External links

1896 births
1978 deaths
Burials at Riverside National Cemetery
Democratic Party members of the California State Assembly
Politicians from Salt Lake City
United States Army soldiers
United States Army personnel of World War I
Military personnel from Salt Lake City